Eden Memorial Park Cemetery is a Jewish cemetery located at 11500 Sepulveda Boulevard, Mission Hills, California, in the San Fernando Valley of Los Angeles.  Many Jews from the entertainment industry are buried here. It is located north of the San Fernando Mission Cemetery.

The operators of the cemetery were accused on more than one occasion of destroying graves and discarding human remains to make room for new burials.

Notable interments
 Phil Arnold (1909–1968), actor
 Marty Allen (1922–2018), actor, comedian
 Terry Becker (1921–2014), actor
 John Brown (1904–1957), actor
 Lenny Bruce (1925–1966), comedian
 James Caan (1940–2022), actor
 Howard Caine (1926–1993), actor
 Jon Cedar (1931–2011), actor
 Harvey Cohen (1951–2007), composer
 Allen Curtis (1878–1961), film director
 Dan Curtis (1927–2006), film producer and director
 Lewis Dauber (1949–2019), actor
 Sam Denoff (1928–2011), screenwriter
 Don Diamond (1921–2011), actor
 Phil Foster (1914–1985), actor
 Bruce Gary (1951–2006), musician
 Michael Gilden (1962–2006), actor
 Bert Gordon (1895–1974), comedian
 Mitzi Green (1920–1969), actress
 Julius Harris (1923–2004), actor
 Morton Heilig (1926–1997), cinematographer, inventor
 Jerry Heller (1940–2016), American music manager
 Jack Herer (1939–2010), cannabis activist
 Sam Jaffe (1891–1984), actor
 Milt Kamen (1921–1977), actor, comic
 Herb Karpel (1917–1995), baseball player
 Kurt Katch (1896–1958), actor
 Al Lapin Jr. (1927–2004), co-founder of IHOP
 Harvey Lembeck (1923–1982), actor, father of actor/director Michael Lembeck
 Larry D. Mann (1922–2014), actor
 Groucho Marx (1890–1977), actor/comedian
 Vic Mizzy (1916–2009), composer
 Brad Morrow (1942–1997), actor
 Buck Ram (1907–1991), songwriter
 Catya Sassoon (1968–2002), actress/model
 Hacham Yedidia Shofet (1908–2004), Chief Rabbi of Iran and worldwide spiritual leader of Persian Jewry
 Roy Stuart (1927–2005), actor
 Rick Vallin (1919–1977), actor
 George Wyle (1915–2003), film and television composer

References

External links
 Eden Memorial Park Cemetery website
 

Cemeteries in Los Angeles
Mission Hills, Los Angeles
Jewish cemeteries in California
Jews and Judaism in Los Angeles
Cemetery vandalism and desecration